Leon Angel (1900-1973) ليون أنجل was a Jewish actor and filmmaker from Alexandria, Egypt. Angel was best known by his screen name, Chalom (Shalom; شالوم; שלום). In the 1930s, Angel appeared in a series of Muslim-Jewish buddy films in which he played a comic Jewish character—also named “Chalom.” While other Jews of Egypt were involved in the Egyptian cinema industry, Angel was the only Jewish star to headline an Egyptian movie playing a Jewish character.  Angel later immigrated to Australia, where he participated in founding the first Sephardic synagogue in Australia.

Early life
Leon Victor Angel was born on May 15, 1900, in Alexandria, Egypt to Olga Piperno and Victor Angelou. His father smuggled hashish along the Nile, and left his family impoverished, so Leon had to work to support his family from a young age. He studied civil engineering through a correspondence course in France. He married fellow Alexandria native, Esther Cohen.

Cinema career
Angel had no prior stage or screen experience when he began collaborating with Togo Mizrahi in 1930 on a script for a feature film about the dangers of drug use. Angel drew on his family's experience in writing the script. The film Cocaine, The Abyss premiered in Alexandria, Egypt on November 19, 1930.

Angel debuted his signature character, Chalom, in the silent film 05001 (1932), directed by Mizrahi. Chalom was Jewish and poor—trying to make ends meet with itinerant jobs, such as selling lottery tickets or operating a food cart. The characterization of Chalom as a member of the working classes appealed to Egyptian audiences who frequented third tier cinemas. Chalom also represented Egyptian Jewish nativeness at a time of uncertainty for Jews of Egypt.

In The Two Delegates (1934), and Mistreated by Affluence (1937), Chalom bumbled through the farcical plot with a Muslim sidekick named ‘Abdu. Through their depiction of Chalom and 'Abdu's friendship and the close relations depicted between other Jews and Muslims, these films advocated for a culture of coexistence.
Leon Angel also directed two films in which he reprised his signature role: Chalom the Dragoman (1935), and The Athlete (1937), co-directed with Clément Mizrahi.

Esther Cohen Angel, Leon’s wife, who appeared under the screen name, ‘Adalat, was often cast as Chalom’s love interest.

Later life

Leon Angel retired from cinema in 1937. He later immigrated to Australia, together with his family. In 1965, Angel was involved in founding the Sephardic Association of Victoria, the first Sephardic Synagogue in Australia.  Leon Angel died in Australia on July 12, 1973.

References

External links 
 
 
 

Egyptian actors
1900 births
1973 deaths